Paulina Aguirre (born Quito) is an Ecuadorian singer-songwriter, humanitarian and 2009 Latin Grammy winner.

In 2007 Aguirre released her first solo album, Mujer de Fe (Woman of Faith), produced by Pablo Aguirre. The album features duets with Latin rap artist Gerardo on "Nada Va a Separarme", as well as Juan Carlos Rodriguez (of Tercer Cielo) on "Eres Mi Refugio". The aforementioned song was chosen as part of Vive, Lo Mejor de La Música Cristiana, a compilation album under Mucho Fruto Music and distributed by Fonovisa /Universal Music Latin Entertainment. Mujer de Fe also received the 2007 Latin Grammy nomination for Best Christian Album.

Career
In 2009 Aguirre released her second recording project, Esperando Tu Voz (Waiting for Your Voice), produced by Pablo Aguirre. The album features a duet with Armando Manzanero on "Cuando me Vaya de Aquí". Esperando Tu Voz received the 2009 Latin Grammy for Best Christian Album and the 2009 Premio Arpa for Best Duet for "Cuando me Vaya de Aqui".

In 2012 Aguirre released her solo album Rompe el Silencio, a non-violence message for women, which was also nominated for a Latin Grammy in 2012.

"Mariachi Divas" was nominated in 2014 for the Latin Grammy for Best Regional Song.

As a songwriter, Paulina has worked with Mario Domm from the group Camila, Taboo from the Black Eyed Peas, for whom she wrote the single "Zumbao" , Mariachi Divas, the film Dedicada a mi Ex "from Sony Pictures and Touche Films creators of the famous youtube channel Enchufe tv. As a singer she has worked with Michael Buble, Luis Miguel. Marta Sanchez, Marco Antonio Solis, and has been a coach for Becky G, Taboo Black Eyed Peas. etc. In the Television part, she has been the voice of the commercials for Desperate House Wives on ABC, for Disney Channel she has been the director and lyricist of two children's projects Tinga –Tinga y Ave y Tres, in Spanish, as well as being the voice of los Solecitos de UNIVISION for which he wrote most of the songs.

In 2018 Paulina was a jury member for the TV show "The World's Best" along with James Corden, Faith Hill, Ru Paul, Drew Berrymore and 48 world entertainment personalities.

In 2020, she appeared for the Cinemoi Oscar's After Party at the Warner Brothers mansion together with Dennis Quaid, Macy Gray, Paul Okenfold, in addition to being a guest artist, she was invited by Chateu de Berne and the French Riviera Film Festival. at the Beverly Hills hotel.

https://reel360.com/article/reel-women-grammy-winner-paulina-aguirre/
It was reported by VidaEnElValle.com that Aguirre is currently working with Taboo (Black Eyed Peas).
https://www.forbes.com.ec/lifestyle/ecuador-va-otro-grammy-ritmo-la-tierra-llora-n24135

Awards
Latin Grammy Awards:
2007: Latin Grammy nominee for Best Christian Album – Mujer de Fe
2009: Latin Grammy nominee for Best Christian Album – Esperando Tu Voz
2009: Latin Grammy winner for Best Christian Album – Esperando Tu Voz
2012: Latin Grammy nominee for Best Christian Album – Rompe el Silencio
2014: Latin Grammy nominee for Regional Mexican Song – Mariachi Divas
2016: Festival Viña del Mar winner – Mejor Intérprete
2016: U.S. International Songwriting Competition for Best Latin Song
2022: Latin Grammy nominee for Best Folk Album

References

External links
 Paulina Aguirre at Allmusic
 Official site

Living people
Latin pop singers
Latin Grammy Award winners
21st-century Ecuadorian women singers
People from Quito
Year of birth missing (living people)
Women in Latin music